The naked and famous is an IBA official cocktail, consisting of equal parts mezcal, yellow Chartreuse, Aperol, and fresh lime juice.

See also
 List of cocktails

References

Cocktails with liqueur
Cocktails with chartreuse
Cocktails with Aperol
Cocktails with mezcal
Cocktails with lime juice